Coelorinchus australis, the javelin, javelinfish, or southern whiptail, is a species of fish found around Australia and New Zealand at depths of between 80 and 500 m.  Its length is between 25 and 50 cm. It is a  brownish color with 8 or 9 pale longitudinal stripes, and a small chin barbel. It feeds on octopus, fishes, and decapod crustaceans.

References

"Coelorinchus Australis  (Richardson, 1839)." FishBase. N.p., n.d. Web. 31 July 2013.
 
 Tony Ayling & Geoffrey Cox, Collins Guide to the Sea Fishes of New Zealand,  (William Collins Publishers Ltd, Auckland, New Zealand 1982) 

Macrouridae
Fish described in 1839